The Wayne State University School of Medicine (WSUSOM) is the medical school of Wayne State University, a public research university in Detroit, Michigan. It enrolls more than 1,500 students in undergraduate medical education, master's degree, Ph.D., and M.D.-Ph.D.. WSUSOM traces its roots through four predecessor institutions since its founding in 1868.

The school's faculty consists of numerous local physicians, many who are members of the Wayne State University Physician Group, and provide care at eleven affiliated hospitals, clinics and training sites throughout the area. Although the school's faculty offer expertise in virtually all medical fields, the institution's areas of research emphasis include cancer, women's and children's health, neuroscience and population studies.

History
The Detroit Medical College was founded in 1868 in a building on Woodward Avenue.  The Michigan College of Medicine was incorporated in 1879 and offered classes in the former Hotel Hesse at the intersection of Gratiot Avenue, Madison Avenue and St Antoine Street. In 1885, the two schools merged to form the Detroit College of Medicine and occupied the former Michigan College of Medicine building. The college was reorganized and refinanced as the Detroit College of Medicine and Surgery in 1913, and five-years later, came under control of the Detroit Board of Education.  In 1933, the Board of Education joined the Detroit College of Medicine and Surgery with the colleges of Liberal Arts, Education, Engineering, Pharmacy, and the Graduate School to form an institution of higher education called the Colleges of the City of Detroit.  This was renamed Wayne University in 1934 and became a state-chartered institution, Wayne State University, in 1956.

Professors at the school provided the "first evidence that glucose is a major stimulant on insulin secretion and, while an increase in the concentration of blood glucose stimulates the secretion of insulin, a decrease inhibits it and, in addition, stimulates the secretion of a blood-sugar raising factor (glucagon) by the pancreas." Subsequent experiments contributed substantially to the establishment of glucagon as a "second pancreatic hormone."

The first successful open heart surgery was performed at the Detroit Medical Center by Wayne State University physician Dr. Forest Dodrill on patient Henry Opitek. He used a machine developed by himself and researchers at General Motors, the Dodrill-GMR, considered to be the first operational mechanical heart used while performing open heart surgery.

Wayne State University School of Medicine is the academic affiliate of the Barbara Ann Karmanos Cancer Institute, one of 26 NCI-designated Cancer Centers in the United States.  WSUSOM researchers, in conjunction with Karmanos Cancer Institute, oversee more than 400 clinical trials, participate in a national program to collect and study cancer data for future research and provide about half of all national statistics on cancer in African Americans. The first drug approved for the treatment of AIDS and HIV infection, Zidovudine was synthesized here. WSUSOM and Karmanos furthered their partnership in 2009, signing an agreement to establish a new academic department at the school for Karmanos researchers and expand their already successful research and teaching partnership.

Community care
The school has strong ties to the local community. Wayne State University has a stated mission to improve the overall health of the community. As part of this mission, the School of Medicine has established with the help of a $6 million NIH grant the Center for Urban and African American Health to seek new ways to redress health disparities by identifying preventive strategies and therapeutic approaches to chronic diseases that plague this population, namely obesity, cardiovascular disease and cancer. More than 500 students annually serve at more than 70 clinical sites and nearly 100 community-based mentoring and outreach locations, and participate in a growing number of public health policy and advocacy opportunities. Year 1 and 2 students volunteer more than 34,000 hours of community service annually.

Perhaps the most significant contribution the school provides to the community is care to area residents who are under- or uninsured. Along with the Detroit Medical Center, WSU faculty physicians provide an average of $150 million in uncompensated care annually.

WSU sponsors a number of community-service and health-awareness programs in southeastern Michigan, including mental-health screenings, Diabetes Day, the Community Health Child Immunization Project, the Detroit Cardiovascular Coalition and Brain Awareness Week. In addition to faculty-sponsored programs, WSU medical students are among the most active in the country for community outreach. The medical students, with supervision, regularly provide free medical care for homeless and unemployed patients at Detroit's Cass Clinic. Student-sponsored outreach programs also include Senior Citizen Outreach Project, Adolescent Substance abuse Prevention Program and Teen Pregnancy Education Program.

Academics
Wayne State University School of Medicine offers many graduate programs including an MD/PhD program, ten Doctor of Philosophy programs, eight Master of Science programs, and four certification programs. It also offers a postbaccalaureate program for pre-medical students that meet its 6 eligibility criteria.

Rankings
Wayne State University School of Medicine is ranked 66th out of 188 in the 2022 edition of the U.S. News & World Report research rankings.

Affiliations
Wayne State University School of Medicine, along with Michigan State University's College of Osteopathic Medicine, is affiliated for undergraduate and graduate medical education with the hospitals of the Detroit Medical Center and Henry Ford Health System.  The Detroit Medical Center includes the Children's Hospital of Michigan, the Rehabilitation Institute of Michigan, Detroit Receiving Hospital, Harper University Hospital, Hutzel Women's Hospital, Sinai-Grace Hospital, Huron Valley-Sinai Hospital, and the DMC Surgery Hospital.  Primary affiliates within the HFHS are Henry Ford Hospital, Henry Ford West Bloomfield Hospital, and Henry Ford Kingswood Hospital, a comprehensive psychiatric facility.  Detroit Receiving Hospital and Henry Ford Hospital are Level 1 Trauma Centers, Children's Hospital of Michigan is a Pediatric Level 1 Trauma Center.  Additionally, it coordinates teaching experiences for students and residents with 14 community hospitals through the Southeast Michigan Center for Medical Education.

Notable alumni

Rana Awdish, M.D., pulmonary and critical care physician and author.
Lawrence "Larry" Brilliant, Physician, epidemiologist, technologist, author, and philanthropist. The former director of Google's philanthropic arm Google.org
 Phyllis Harrison-Ross, psychiatrist working with developmentally disabled and mentally ill children
Ron Krome, first editor-in-chief Annals of Emergency Medicine and former president of American College of Emergency Physicians
Christopher W. Lentz, U.S. Air Force Brigadier General
 Jerry Michael Linenger, M.D., retired Captain in the United States Navy Medical Corps and a former NASA astronaut who flew on the Space Shuttle and Space Station Mir.
Joe Schwarz, former U.S. Representative for Michigan's 7th congressional district.

Notable faculty 
 Flossie Cohen, former professor, pediatric immunologist
 Margo Cohen, former professor and head of Endocrinology and Metabolism; later the founder of Exocell
 Morris Goodman, PhD, member of the National Academy of Science
 David Gorski, associate professor of surgery, blogger on alternative medicine and pseudoscience
 Bhanu Pratap Jena, cell biologist & discoverer of Porosomes
 John S. Meyer, M.D., founding professor and Chairman of Neurology in 1957
 Werner Spitz, former Chief Medical Examiner of Wayne County, Michigan
 Gabriel Steiner, former professor of neurology and neuropathology, known for his research of multiple sclerosis.

References

External links
Official website

School Of Medicine
Medical schools in Michigan
Educational institutions established in 1868
1868 establishments in Michigan
Universities and colleges in Detroit